The Capoferri M1 was a Group 6 sports prototype race car, designed, developed and built by Renzo Zorzi, in 1979. It was closely based on, and took similar design cues from the similar Lola T286, which was also a racing prototype. It won a single race, at Enna-Pergusa, in 1980, where it also won in its class, and took pole position for the race. Similar to the Lola, it was powered by a  naturally-aspirated Ford-Cosworth DFV V8 engine, producing around  @ 10,500 rpm.

References

Sports prototypes
24 Hours of Le Mans race cars
Group 6 (racing) cars